In  the Nippon Professional Baseball season ended with the Hokkaido Nippon-Ham Fighters of the Pacific League defeating the Chunichi Dragons of the Central League in the Japan Series.

Format

Central League
Season Format
Regular Season
Regular Season 1st place are the champions

Pacific League
 Season Format
 Regular Season
 Playoff 1st Stage: Regular Season 2nd place vs. Regular Season 3rd place – Best of 3
 Playoff 2nd Stage: Regular Season 1st place vs. Playoff 1st Stage winners – Best of 5 (regular-season 1st place take a one-win advantage)
 Playoff 2nd Stage winners are the champions

Japan Series
 Central League champions vs. Pacific League champions – Best of 7

Standings

Central League

Regular season

Pacific League

Regular season

Playoff 1st Stage
Seibu Lions (1) vs. Fukuoka SoftBank Hawks (2)

Playoff 2nd Stage
Hokkaido Nippon-Ham Fighters (3) vs. Fukuoka Softbank Hawks (0) The Fighters have a one-game advantage.

Japan Series

In the 2006 Japan Series, the Hokkaido Nippon-Ham Fighters defeated the Chunichi Dragons 4 games to 1 in five games.

After the Japan Series, the Fighters moved on to the Asian Series, a series which determines the champion of the four major Asian baseball leagues.

Awards
The Eiji Sawamura Award, the award given to the top pitcher in Japan, was given to pitcher Kazumi Saito of the Fukuoka SoftBank Hawks. He had a win–loss record of 18-5, 205 strikeouts, and an ERA of 1.75 in 201.0 innings, winning the Pacific League's pitching triple crown.

Best Nine Awards
Central League

Pacific League

Gold Gloves
Central League

Pacific League

See also
2006 Major League Baseball season

References
2006 NPB Final standings (Japanese)